Megas Alexandros Xiropotamos F.C. is a Greek football club, based in Xiropotamos, Drama, Greece.

Honors

Domestic Titles and honors

 Drama FCA Champions: 1
 2016-17
 Drama FCA Cup Winners: 1
 1977-78

References

Football clubs in Eastern Macedonia and Thrace
Drama
Association football clubs established in 1952
1952 establishments in Greece
Gamma Ethniki clubs